Walter Frederick Marcus Jr. (July 26, 1927 – April 8, 2004) was a justice of the Louisiana Supreme Court from 1973 to 2000.

Early life, education, and career
Born in New Orleans, Marcus graduated from Phillips Exeter Academy, and served in the United States military during World War II, as part of the occupation of Japan. He and received an undergraduate degree from Yale University, and was then recalled for service in the Korean War, after which he received an LL.B. from Tulane University Law School in 1955.

Political and judicial service
Marcus was elected to the New Orleans City Council in 1962, and was reelected in 1966, although he left the city council shortly into his second term after winning election as a district court judge, where he remained until his election to the state supreme court.

He was elected to the Louisiana Supreme Court in 1973, defeating Jim Garrison, among others, to win the seat. He was twice reelected, in 1980, and without opposition in 1990. He declined to run for a fourth term in 2000. As a justice, Marcus "won a reputation as a consensus builder", and saw a substantial proportion of his opinions become majority opinions of the court.

Personal life and death
In 1952, Marcus married Barbara Faye Cohn of Fort Worth, Texas, with whom he had two sons, and one daughter. He died of pneumonia at Touro Infirmary in New Orleans, at the age of 76.

References

Justices of the Louisiana Supreme Court
New Orleans City Council members
Phillips Exeter Academy alumni
Yale University alumni
Tulane University Law School alumni
1927 births
2004 deaths
People from New Orleans
American expatriates in Japan